Churhat Assembly constituency is one of the 230 constituencies of Madhya Pradesh Legislative Assembly. It is a segment of Sidhi Lok Sabha constituency.

Members of Legislative Assembly

^Bypoll

Election results

2018

2013

See also
 Churhat
 Sidhi (Lok Sabha constituency)
 Sidhi district

References

Assembly constituencies of Madhya Pradesh
Sidhi district